The 2018 Holy Cross Crusaders football team represented the College of the Holy Cross as a member of the Patriot League during the 2018 NCAA Division I FCS football season. Led by first-year head coach Bob Chesney, Holy Cross compiled an overall record of 5–6 with a mark of 4–2 in conference play, tying for second place in the Patriot League. The Crusaders played their home games at Fitton Field in Worcester, Massachusetts.

Previous season
The Crusaders began the 2017 season led by 14th-year head coach Tom Gilmore for the first seven games of the season before he was fired following a 2–5 start. Offensive coordinator Brian Rock was named interim head coach for the final four games. They finished the season 4–7, 3–3 in Patriot League play to finish in a three-way tie for third place.

Preseason

Preseason coaches poll
The Patriot League released their preseason coaches poll on July 26, 2018, with the Crusaders predicted to finish in fourth place.

Preseason All-Patriot League team
The Crusaders placed four players on the preseason all-Patriot League team.

Offense

Blaise Bell – WR

Defense

Teddy Capsis – DL

Neil Vorster – DL

Ryan Brady – LB

Schedule

Game summaries

at Colgate

at Boston College

Yale

Dartmouth

Bucknell

at New Hampshire

at Harvard

Lehigh

at Lafayette

Fordham

at Georgetown

References

Holy Cross
Holy Cross Crusaders football seasons
Holy Cross Crusaders football